R v Kapp, 2008 SCC 41 is a Supreme Court of Canada case dealing with an appeal from a British Columbia Court of Appeal decision that held that a communal fishing license granted exclusively to Aboriginals did not violate section 15 of the Canadian Charter of Rights and Freedoms. The Supreme Court dismissed the appeal on the basis a distinction based on an enumerated or analogous ground in a government program will not constitute discrimination under section 15 if, under section 15(2): (1) the program has an ameliorative or remedial purpose; and (2) the program targets a disadvantaged group identified by the enumerated or analogous grounds. In other words, the Court found that the prima facie discrimination was allowed because it was aimed at improving the situation of a disadvantaged group as allowed by section 15(2) of the Charter.

This decision recognizes difficulty found with Law v Canada (Minister of Employment and Immigration) in trying to employ "human dignity" as a legal test. No doubt human dignity is an essential value underlying section 15, but it is an abstract and subjective notion that, even with the guidance of the four factors outlined in Law, is confusing to apply and has proven to be an additional burden on equality claimants. This case reinterprets Law so that it does not impose a new and distinctive test for discrimination, but rather affirms the approach to substantive equality set out in Andrews v Law Society of British Columbia and developed in the following decisions.

The central purpose of combatting discrimination underlies both sections 15(1) and 15(2). Section 15(1) focuses on preventing governments from making distinctions based on the enumerated or analogous grounds that have the effect of perpetuating group disadvantage and prejudice, or impose disadvantage on the basis of stereotyping. Section 15(2) focuses on enabling governments to proactively combat existing discrimination through affirmative measures.

See also 

 substantive equality

References 
 Full text of R. v. Kapp SCC (CanLII)

Supreme Court of Canada cases
Canadian Aboriginal case law
2008 in Canadian case law
Section Fifteen Charter case law